The Graber Olive House in Ontario, California, is original site of the longest operating olive packing business in the United States. The family home, in which the product, designated as Graber Olives, was developed, now is designated as historic and the original farm is designated as a historic site. The business was founded in 1894, two years after Clifford C. Graber and his brother, Charles, arrived from Clay City, Indiana.

History
Acquiring property in Ontario, 19-year-old Clifford ("Cliff") Graber began growing citrus on his newly acquired acreage. Delighting in the taste of the locally grown olives cured by neighboring ranchers, however, he planted olive trees and started curing his own. His olives proved so popular that he soon launched a small-scale business. In 1894, two years after planting his olive trees, Graber began selling vat-cured olives. 

He married Georgia Belle Noe in 1905. She participated in the business and sold fresh olives right out of the vats used to hold the olives after they had been picked.

By 1910, Graber had developed a rope-propelled apparatus for grading olives by size. At the same time, he began canning them. A decade later, expanding his operations, he planted his trademark Manzanilla olive trees in Hemet. In 1934, Graber enlarged his cannery on the Ontario site. Nine years later, their sons, Robert and William, took over the business, although Cliff remained active until his death in 1955 at age 83. 

By 1963, Robert ("Bob") Graber, who was born in the family home on the Graber Olives property in Ontario, had become sole proprietor of the business. Bob Graber and his wife, Betty, continued to work in the family business along with their son, Cliff, now residing in the family home. At that time, Bob Graber moved the growing operation to 75 acres of olive groves in the San Joaquin Valley, near Porterville, where it remains.

From Porterville the harvested olives are trucked to Ontario during the harvest season, lasting about two months each fall, for canning.

Operations
The business boasts that their olives are unique because they are tree-ripened before they are picked, according to Flo Duncan, personnel director for Graber Olive House. Duncan also notes that the business is not computerized.

Once the olives arrive at the Ontario site, they are graded by size, then cured in one of 550 concrete vats for three weeks. Water and salt solutions are changed daily. After they are removed from the vats, the olives are fed through a filling wheel, where employees scoop them by hand into aluminum cans running on a conveyor belt. 

A "Panama paddle packer" machine creates a 200-degree steam bath as cans are sealed tight with aluminum lids. Then giant pressure cookers, called retorts, pressurize the cans and their contents for 62 minutes at 242 degrees fahrenheit. After the cans cool, a labeling machine applies their identifications and sizes, from the smallest (size 12) to the largest (size 16).

In a little more than three weeks, Graber Olives progress from tree to can. In a good season, the business processes approximately 150 tons of olives, which they ship to markets, gourmet stores and customers globally, according to Duncan.

In the media

Television 

In May 2020, the Graber Olive House was featured on a season 19 episode of Ghost Adventures entitled "The Graber Family Farm. Owner Robert Graber Jr. has had his staff and other paranormal investigators have reported paranormal claims of what they all call "The Creeper", a vicious entity, believed to be an elemental that torments them in the vat room. Employees who came into contact with this supernatural entity have died in recent years.

References
Schwartz, Penny E., Special to The Press-Enterprise

Guerrero, Christina, staff writer, Ontario Olives Pampered, Perfect, Inland Valley Daily Bulletin Newspaper, October 24, 2003, page A3

External links
 Graber Olive House - official site
 https://www.facebook.com/Graber-Olives-72200248165/
 https://www.instagram.com/graber_olive_house/
 https://www.pinterest.com/graberolives/

Companies based in San Bernardino County, California
Olives
Ontario, California